Dioryctria ponderosae, the ponderosa twig moth, is a moth of the family Pyralidae. The species was first described by Harrison Gray Dyar Jr. in 1914. It is found in North America from Washington and Montana south to California and northern Mexico.

The forewings are black with some reddish scales in the basal, subbasal and terminal areas. There is a white discocellular spot, which contrasts strongly with the forewing.

The larvae feed on Pinus ponderosa. They bore in the cambium under the bark of the host plant, producing pitch masses on the trunk.

Gallery

References

Moths described in 1914
ponderosae